Greensboro Depot may refer to:

Greensboro Depot (Greensboro, Georgia), listed on the National Register of Historic Places in Greene County, Georgia
Greensboro Depot (Greensboro Bend, Vermont), listed on the National Register of Historic Places in Orleans County, Vermont